William Duncan Strong (1899–1962) was an American archaeologist and anthropologist noted for his application of the direct historical approach to the study of indigenous peoples of North and South America.

Early life and education
Strong was born in Portland, Oregon.

He initially studied zoology, but he changed his focus to anthropology at the University of California, Berkeley, under the influence of Alfred L. Kroeber, who became his "principal teacher, mentor, and friend". Strong completed his doctorate in 1926.

Career
Strong's doctoral dissertation, "An Analysis of Southwestern Society", was published in American Anthropologist. A related study of his, Aboriginal Society in Southern California, presenting his detailed fieldwork among the Serrano, Luiseño, Cupeño, and Cahuilla peoples, has been characterized as "one of the earliest and one of the best efforts by a United States anthropologist to combine structural-functional analysis with historical data and interpretation". Strong also conducted ethnographic field research among the Naskapi of Labrador.

Most of Strong's anthropological contributions were specifically in archaeology. His 1935 study, "An Introduction to Nebraska Archaeology", is credited with providing a major impetus for the direct historical approach in archaeology.

In the 1930s, Strong, Waldo Rudolph Wedel and A. T. Hill found archaeological evidence in Nebraska different from the prehistoric Central Plains and Woodland traditions. The evidence was attributed to a new culture called the Dismal River culture, or Dismal River aspect, for its location on the Dismal River basin of Nebraska, dated between 1650-1750.

Strong performed pioneering fieldwork in California's San Joaquin Valley, the Pacific Northwest, the American Great Plains, Labrador, and Honduras, where he sought the legendary La Ciudad Blanca. In Peru, he developed statistical methods to seriate pottery styles and is credited with the discovery of the tomb of the war god Ai apaec in 1946.

Strong held academic positions at the University of Nebraska and Columbia University. Among his notable students were the archaeologists Waldo Wedel and Gordon Willey.

Notes

External links
Register to the Papers of William Duncan Strong, National Anthropological Archives, Smithsonian Institution

1899 births
1962 deaths
American ethnologists
American Mesoamericanists
20th-century Mesoamericanists
Mesoamerican archaeologists
20th-century American archaeologists